Mary Winter Fisher (1867–1928) was an American physician known for her establishment of a medical practice in Pagosa Springs, Colorado.

Early life and education
Fisher was born February 10, 1867, in Lewiston, Illinois to John S. Winter, a journalist who later became a judge, and Mary Winter. Six months after she was born, her mother died.

Fisher attended medical school in Chicago; first attendeding classes at Rush University, then completing her education at the Hahneman Medical School where she obtained a Doctor of Homeopathy and Surgery degree.

Career
In 1895 she moved to the San Juan Mountains of Southern Colorado as a single, 28-year old woman. She first settled in La Jara, Colorado, where she taught for a term in a public shool that had been founded by her sister. She then moved to the small town of Pagosa Springs, between Durango, Colorado, and Chama, New Mexico. She opened a medical office in Pagosa Springs the same year. The town had several bathhouses fed by local hot springs that were established in the 1860s. The mineral waters were used for their balneotheraputic properties by local miners as well as by injured Civil War soldiers.

Fisher became known locally as Dr. Mary. She developed a reputation throughout the state for her diagnostic abilities, and skillful treatments.

In 1911 she worked as the coroner for Archuleta County, and also served as the county's officer of health.

Personal life

In December 1902 she married J.P. Fisher, a pharmacist.

Fisher admired wildlife, and had a pet wolf, and a pet bear named Pickles.

Death and legacy
Later in life, Fisher developed breast cancer and eventually died of the disease at the age of 61 on May 30, 1928.

The Dr. Mary Fisher Clinic, now known as the Pagosa Springs Medical Center is named after her, as is the Dr. Mary Fisher Medical Foundation, and the Dr. Mary Fisher Park in Pagosa Springs.

Her former home at 138 Pagosa Street where she first operated her medical practice, is designated as a historic landmark.

References

Women physicians
1867 births
1928 deaths
American homeopaths
Women surgeons
People from Archuleta County, Colorado
People from Illinois
People from Pagosa Springs, Colorado